Sea God may refer to:

 Any of various water deities
 The Sea God, a 1930 American film
 Emperor of the Sea (Hangul: 해신; RR: Hae-sin; literally "Sea God"), a South Korean television drama series